The Créole was a 24-gun  of the French Navy.

Career 

She took part in the Pastry War under lieutenant commander de Joinville, and most notably in the Bombardment of San Juan de Ulloa.

On 20 January 1844, Créole was driven ashore on Negropont, Greece. She was later refloated.

Model
A finely crafted shipyard model is on display at the Musée national de la Marine in Paris. It was originally stored in the office of the prince de Joinville.

Sources and references

 
 Sail corvettes (24 guns)

Age of Sail corvettes of France
Ships built in France
1829 ships
Maritime incidents in January 1844